The 1963 Harvard Crimson football team was an American football team that represented Harvard University during the 1963 NCAA University Division football season. Harvard finished third in the Ivy League.

In their seventh year under head coach John Yovicsin, the Crimson compiled a 5–2–2 record and outscored opponents 122 to 76. William W. Southmayd was the team captain.

Harvard's 4–2–1 conference record was the third-best in the Ivy League standings. The Crimson outscored Ivy opponents 94 to 76. 

Harvard played its home games at Harvard Stadium in the Allston neighborhood of Boston, Massachusetts.

Schedule

References

Harvard
Harvard Crimson football seasons
Harvard Crimson football
1960s in Boston